Divinas palabras may refer to:

 Divinas palabras (1987 film), a 1987 Spanish film directed by José Luis García Sánchez
 Divinas palabras (1977 film), a 1977 Mexican film directed by Juan Ibáñez